James G. Hopkins (June 15, 1801 – July 6, 1860) was an American lawyer and politician from New York.

Life
He lived in Ogdensburg, New York. He married Elizabeth Rosseel (1813–1864). He was Clerk of St. Lawrence County from 1826 to 1831.

He was a Whig member of the New York State Senate (4th D.) from 1840 to 1843, sitting in the 63rd, 64th, 65th and 66th New York State Legislatures.

He was Secretary of the Northern Railroad Company.

He died while on vacation at Saratoga Springs, New York, and was buried at the Ogdensburg Cemetery.

Sources
The New York Civil List compiled by Franklin Benjamin Hough (pages 132ff, 142 and 393; Weed, Parsons and Co., 1858)
American Railroad Journal (issue of November 11, 1848; pg. 725)

External links

1801 births
1860 deaths
New York (state) state senators
People from Ogdensburg, New York
New York (state) Whigs
19th-century American politicians
19th-century American railroad executives